Caprioli is an Italian surname. Notable people with the surname include:

 Aliprando Caprioli, engraver
 Anita Caprioli (born 1973), theatre and film actress
 Domenico Caprioli (1494–1528), painter
 Robert Caprioli (born 1967), footballer
 Vittorio Caprioli (1921–1989), film actor, director and screenwriter

See also
 Capriolo, town in Lombardy
 Caprioli, village in Campania
 Gerre de' Caprioli, municipality in Lombardy

Italian-language surnames